John MacGregor (10 July 1904 – 28 February 1980) was a Canadian boxer. He competed in the men's flyweight event at the 1924 Summer Olympics.

References

External links
 

1904 births
1980 deaths
Canadian male boxers
Olympic boxers of Canada
Boxers at the 1924 Summer Olympics
Place of birth missing
Flyweight boxers